The 2010 FILA European Wrestling Championships was held in Baku, Azerbaijan, from 13 April to 18 April 2010.

Because of the ongoing dispute over Karabakh between Armenia and Azerbaijan, Armenia chose not to compete at this event for the safety of their wrestlers.

Medal table

Team ranking

Medal summary

Men's freestyle

Men's Greco-Roman

Women's freestyle

External links
Official website

Europe
W
European Wrestling Championships
Euro
Sports competitions in Baku
2010 in European sport
April 2010 sports events in Europe
2010s in Baku